Song Khwae may refer to:

Song Khwae, Doi Lo is a subdistrict (tambon) of Doi Lo District, in Chiang Mai Province, Thailand.
Song Khwae District is  a district (Amphoe) in the northwestern part of Nan Province, northern Thailand.